Naked Baby Photos is a compilation album comprising outtake material from recordings of Ben Folds Five's first two studio albums and live performances. Most of the tracks are previously unreleased rarities.

Caroline Records' webpage for Naked Baby Photos features explanations of each track's origins from Ben Folds.

Track listing

Personnel
Ben Folds Five
Ben Folds – vocals, piano
Robert Sledge – bass, background vocals
Darren Jessee – drums, background vocals

Production
Mastered by Howie Weinberg
Scott MacLeod - Live Sound Engineer
Leo Overtoom - Live Sound Engineer
Alan Wolmack - Management
Peter Felstead - Management
Wendi Horowitz - Sleeve design
Robert Sledge - Sleeve design
John Falls - Outer booklet photos
Anna Goodman - Cowrote Alice Childress

References

Ben Folds Five albums
1998 compilation albums
Albums produced by John Alagía
Caroline Records compilation albums